"One Way Ticket" is the lead single from British rock band the Darkness' second studio album, One Way Ticket to Hell... And Back. It reached number eight on the UK Singles Chart. Its lyrics explicitly deal with cocaine use and addiction. The song contains frequent references to taking and being on cocaine, one of the reasons Justin Hawkins was admitted to rehab.

The beginning of the song features a pan flute solo, then a noise of one snorting cocaine, before the starting riff begins. The cover art features a stylised British Rail Aptis ticket, taken from their hometown of Lowestoft, in Suffolk, surrounded by fire.

Track listings
 CD single
 "One Way Ticket" (Explicit Album Edit) - 3:42
 "Wanker" - 3:07

 Digital single 1
 "One Way Ticket" (Explicit Album Edit) - 3:42
 "Grief Hammer" - 3:12

 Digital single 2
 "One Way Ticket" (Explicit Album Edit) - 3:42
 "Wanker" - 3:07

 Digital download 1
 "One Way Ticket" (Full Explicit Version) - 3:41

 Digital download 2
 "One Way Ticket" (Radio Edit) - 3:29

 Digital download 3
 "One Way Ticket" (Clean Album Edit) - 3:38

 German CD single
 "One Way Ticket" (Explicit Album Edit) - 3:42
 "Wanker" - 3:07
 "Grief Hammer" - 3:12
 "One Way Ticket" (Music Video) - 3:45

 DVD single
 "One Way Ticket" (Music Video) - 3:45
 "One Way Ticket" (Making of the Video) - 2:00
 "One Way Ticket" (Explicit Album Edit) - 3:42
 "Grief Hammer" - 3:12

 7-inch vinyl 1
 "One Way Ticket" (Explicit Album Edit) - 3:42
 "Grief Hammer" - 3:12

 7-inch vinyl 2
 "One Way Ticket" (Explicit Album Edit) - 3:42
 "Wanker" - 3:07

Chart positions

References

2005 singles
2005 songs
Atlantic Records singles
The Darkness (band) songs
Song recordings produced by Roy Thomas Baker
Songs about drugs
Songs written by Dan Hawkins (musician)
Songs written by Frankie Poullain
Songs written by Justin Hawkins